Giray may refer to:

Given name
 Giray Bulak, Turkish football coach
 Giray Kaçar, Turkish footballer

Surname
 Safa Giray, Turkish politician

Crimean dynasty
‘Giray’ was used as a surname by all male members of the Crimean ruling house. 

Every ruler of the Crimean Khanate had the surname “Giray” except for Nur Devlet and possibly Hayder of Crimea. See
 Giray dynasty
 List of Crimean khans. 

Turkic-language surnames
Turkic masculine given names